Similar to marketing collateral definition, e-marketing collateral is the collection of basic internet tactical activities that supports the marketing of a product or a service on the internet. These basic tactics are intended to support, facilitate and ease the internet presence of a website, product or a service.

These activities enforced themselves as givens nowadays, common e-marketing collateral include:

 Building the e-presence; whether it is a website, blog, microsite or a portal.
 Search engine marketing, including search engine optimization and search engine registration. With the prevalence of mobile devices, e-marketing collateral must often be targeted towards mobile devices and localized search.
 Online directories registration.
 Social media accounts setup and social media optimization.

Original e-commerce marketing:
Web sites
Display ads
Measures “eyeballs” and impressions of display ads

Social, mobile, local e-commerce marketing:
Social media: Facebook, Twitter, Pinterest
Mobile, localized ads and apps, geo-location
Measures “conversations” and “engagement”.

In 2014, 135 billion dollars were spent by marketers on new online marketing collateral.

References 

Digital marketing